The 2016 Cupa Ligii Final was the final match of the 2015–16 Cupa Ligii, played between Steaua București and Concordia Chiajna. Steaua București won the match with 2–1 after extra time.

Match

References

External links
 Official site 

2016
2015–16 in Romanian football
2016